Rosmainar (born  in Jakarta) was an Indonesian female weightlifter, competing in the 48 kg category and representing Indonesia at international competitions. 

She participated at the 2004 Summer Olympics in the 48 kg event.
She competed at world championships, at the 2003 World Weightlifting Championships.

Major results

References

External links
 
 
 https://www.theguardian.com/sport/2004/aug/15/athensolympics2004.olympicgames4
 http://www.todor66.com/weightlifting/World/2003/Women_under_48kg.html
 http://ww.todor66.com/olim/2004/Weightlifting/Women_under_48kg.html
 http://www.alamy.com/stock-photo-rosmainar-rosmainar-of-indonesia-drops-the-weight-during-the-clean-120975673.html

1976 births
Living people
Indonesian female weightlifters
Weightlifters at the 2004 Summer Olympics
Olympic weightlifters of Indonesia
Sportspeople from Jakarta
World Weightlifting Championships medalists
Weightlifters at the 2002 Asian Games
Asian Games competitors for Indonesia
Southeast Asian Games bronze medalists for Indonesia
Southeast Asian Games medalists in weightlifting
Competitors at the 2003 Southeast Asian Games
20th-century Indonesian women
21st-century Indonesian women